Pentace is a genus of flowering plant in the family Malvaceae sensu lato or Tiliaceae.

Species
There are approximately 34 species in this genus, including:
 Pentace acuta
 Pentace burmanica
 Pentace curtisii
 Pentace excelsa
 Pentace exima
 Pentace grandiflora
 Pentace laxiflora
 Pentace microlepidota
 Pentace perakensis
 Pentace strychnoidea

References

 
Malvaceae genera
Taxonomy articles created by Polbot